Physalaemus santafecinus is a species of frog in the family Leptodactylidae. It is found in Argentina and possibly Paraguay.
Its natural habitats are temperate grassland, intermittent freshwater lakes, intermittent freshwater marshes, and pastureland. It is threatened by habitat loss.

References 

santafecinus
Amphibians of Argentina
Taxonomy articles created by Polbot
Amphibians described in 1965